Homalocalyx thryptomenoides is a member of the family Myrtaceae endemic to Western Australia.

It blooms between July and November producing pink-purple-red flowers.

It is found on sand plains in a large area in the Mid West, Wheatbelt and Goldfields-Esperance regions of Western Australia where it grows in sandy soils.

References

thryptomenoides
Endemic flora of Western Australia
Myrtales of Australia
Rosids of Western Australia
Plants described in 1987
Taxa named by Ferdinand von Mueller